One Nation Under God may refer to:

 One Nation Under God (album)
 One Nation Under God (2009 film)
 One Nation Under God (1993 film)

See also
 Pledge of Allegiance, an oath of loyalty to the national flag and the republic of the United States of America